Christopher Andrew may refer to:
Christopher Andrew (historian) (born 1941), Cambridge University historian
Rob Andrew (born 1963), Christopher Robert "Rob" Andrew, English rugby union player

See also

Christopher Andrews (disambiguation)